The 1950 Sydney to Hobart Yacht Race, was the sixth annual running of the "blue water classic" Sydney to Hobart Yacht Race.

Hosted by the Cruising Yacht Club of Australia based in Sydney, New South Wales, the 1950 edition began on Sydney Harbour, at noon on Boxing Day (26 December 1950), before heading south for 630 nautical miles (1,170 km) through the Tasman Sea, past Bass Strait, into Storm Bay and up the River Derwent, to cross the finish line in Hobart, Tasmania.

The 1950 Sydney to Hobart Yacht Race comprised a fleet of 16 competitors. Margaret Rintoul, skippered by AW Edwards won line honours in a time of 5 days, 5 hours and 28 minutes. Colin Haselgrove's Nerida, was awarded handicap honours on adjusted time.

1950 fleet
16 yachts registered to begin the 1950 Sydney to Hobart Yacht race.

Results

References

See also
Sydney to Hobart Yacht Race

Sydney to Hobart Yacht Race
S
1950 in Australian sport
December 1950 sports events in Australia